The 1974–75 Drexel Dragons men's basketball team represented Drexel University during the 1974–75 men's basketball season. The Dragons, led by 4th year head coach Ray Haesler, played their home games at the 32nd Street Armory and were members of the East Coast Conference (ECC).

The team finished the season 12–11, and finished in 7th place in the ECC East in the regular season.

Roster

Schedule

|-
!colspan=9 style="background:#F8B800; color:#002663;"| Regular season
|-

Awards
Doug Romanczuk
ECC All-Conference Second Team

References

Drexel Dragons men's basketball seasons
Drexel
1974 in sports in Pennsylvania
1975 in sports in Pennsylvania